Cottunculus granulosus is a species of fish in the family Psychrolutidae (blobfishes) found in the Southwest Atlantic Ocean.

References

granulosus
Fish described in 1968
Taxa named by Christine Karrer